Richard Fields may refer to:

 Richard Fields (All My Children), a fictional character on All My Children
 Rich Fields (born 1960), American broadcaster
 Richard "Dimples" Fields (1942–2000), American singer

See also
Richard Field (disambiguation)